Kevin Max Grogan, better known by the stage name Veronica Green, is a British drag performer most known for competing on the second and third series of RuPaul's Drag Race UK.

Career
Prior to appearing on RuPaul's Drag Race, Green appeared on BBC One music reality television show All Together Now and performed in front of fellow RuPaul's Drag Race UK contestant Divina de Campo. In December 2020, Green was announced as one of twelve contestants competing on the second series of RuPaul's Drag Race UK and came ninth overall on the season after departing due to contracting COVID-19. She received an open invitation to appear on the third series of the show, she lasted till week 3 of the competition where she was eliminated after losing a lip sync to Vanity Milan, placing ninth for a second time.

In May 2021, Green performed alongside series 1 winner The Vivienne, and fellow series 2 contestant Tia Kofi at the Vaudeville Theatre in Drag Queens of Pop, which ran for three dates and was one of the first performances on the West End after the third national COVID-19 lockdown in England.

In October 2021, she released a new single, "Nothing To Lose", in collaboration with Myleene Klass.
She also appeared in a TV and online ad campaign by Bailey's promote its Irish Cream, featuring three witches, played by Green, Tia Kofi and Asia Thorne. It was released in Australia, America as well as the UK.
 
In February 2022, Green will embark on RuPaul's Drag Race UK: The Official Tour alongside the entire cast of series 2, in association with World of Wonder and promoter Voss Events.

Filmography

Television

Music videos

Discography

Stage

References

Year of birth missing (living people)
Living people
20th-century LGBT people
21st-century LGBT people
English drag queens
Gay entertainers
RuPaul's Drag Race UK contestants